Yves Bot (August 22, 1947 –  June 9, 2019) was a French magistrate who served until his death as Advocate General at the European Court of Justice.

Biography 
In 1995, Yves Bot was nominated by Jacques Toubon, then Minister of Justice, as prosecutor of Nanterre. He directed the courthouse of Le Mans and worked as a counsellor to Pierre Méhaignerie at the Ministry of Justice.

Between October 2002 and October 2004, he was procureur (head of the prosecution) of the Paris Court of large claims (Tribunal de grande instance). Between October 2004 and October 2006, he was procureur général (head of the prosecution and supervisor of the prosecutors of lower courts) of the Paris Court of Appeals, and as such one of the most important members of the French prosecution service. From 2006 until his death, he was Advocate General at the European Court of Justice.

See also
List of members of the European Court of Justice

References

External links 
 Biography, Website European Court of Justice

20th-century French lawyers
Advocates General of the European Court of Justice
1947 births
2019 deaths
People from Château-Thierry
Paris 2 Panthéon-Assas University alumni
Commanders of the Ordre national du Mérite
French officials of the European Union
21st-century French lawyers